The Good Doctor is a 1939 Argentine film directed by Mario Soffici. The film premiered in Buenos Aires on January 18, 1939 and starred Enrique Muiño.

Cast
Roberto Airaldi
Gloria Bayardo
Dolores Dardes
Armando Durán
Inés Edmonson
Cirilo Etulain
Ángel Magaña
Osvaldo Moreno
Enrique Muiño
Alberto Terrones
Alicia Vignoli

External links

1939 films
1930s Spanish-language films
Argentine black-and-white films
Films directed by Mario Soffici
1939 drama films
Argentine drama films
1930s Argentine films